The Mundy Regional Park is a regional park located on the western edge of the Darling Scarp, approximately  east of Perth in Western Australia. The  park has commanding views of the Swan Coastal Plain, the city of Perth and surrounding suburbs. The park is managed by the Department of Biodiversity, Conservation and Attractions.

Location and features
The park contains the  Lesmurdie Falls, formed by Lesmurdie Brook emptying over the Scarp, and the surrounding riparian and heath vegetation. 
Wandoo, jarrah and marri trees can all be found within the park. A gravity hill exists near the carpark on Palm Terrace.

The Mundy Regional Park has multiple walking and running trails of varying difficulty and is popular for walking and running. The walking trails include: Lesmurdie Brook Loop, Lewis Road Walk, Palm Terrace Walk,Xanthorrhoea Trail, Whistlepipe Gully.

Some sections allow horse riding and off-road cycling.

Gallery

See also

 Forrestfield, Western Australia
 Lesmurdie, Western Australia
 List of waterfalls of Western Australia

References

External links
 Mundy Regional Park - Department of Parks and Wildlife
 

Parks in Perth, Western Australia
Lesmurdie, Western Australia
Regional parks in Western Australia
Jarrah Forest